Pamhagen is a town in the district of Neusiedl am See in the Austrian state of Burgenland.

History 
The first mention of Pamhagen was in 1268. A court day was documented in the city during 1547. In 1652, schools are mentioned for the first time.

During 1909, the Pamhagen Credit Union was founded. The SWIFT code is BIC RLBBAT2E071.

Like the rest of Burgenland, the town was part of Hungary under Austria-Hungary until 1920/1921.

Population

References

Cities and towns in Neusiedl am See District